Sila National Park (Italian: Parco Nazionale della Sila) is an Italian national park in Calabria. It was established in 1997 and covers about 74,000 hectares. Its highest mountains are Mt. Botte Dotato (1,928m), in Sila Grande, and Mt. Gariglione (1,764m) in Sila Piccola. The park is set with the Regional Decree 14.11.2002 from the Official Journal num. 63 - 17/03/2003 and includes its own Management Agency founded. This park area includes the territories formerly as part of the “Historical” Calabria National Park  (1968), which protects areas of great environmental interest in Sila Piccola, Sila Grande and Sila Greca, for a total of 736.95 utenti che seguo kilometers, in 21 municipalities, 6 Mountains Communities (Comunità Montane) and 3 provinces of Calabria Region.

About
In the center of Calabria sits Sila National Park. It offers visitors a fascinating place, full of beautiful routes and exciting landscapes, mountains and enchanted valleys. There are spectacular plants and a wide variety of animals that roam about. The park preserves one of the most significant biodiverse and scenic natural wonders, truly deserving the utmost of protection. The park's symbol is the wolf, a hunted species for centuries that has withstood its survival until 1970, when a law in favor of its preservation was established. Sila National Park offers magnificent sceneries of history that changes with the seasons. This park is full of a magical atmosphere, wondrous contrasts and harmonious arrangements of colors and shades.

References

External links
 Pages by the Park Authority on Parks.it
 Yearbook of the Italian Parks 2005, edited by Comunicazione in association with Federparchi and the Italian State Tourism Board 
 BIOEUPARKS, in association and Co-funded by the Intelligent Energy Europe—Programme of the European Union

National parks of Italy
Parks in Calabria
Protected areas established in 1997
Protected areas of the Apennines